Escape from Alcatraz is the fourth solo album by rapper Rasco and the first on his own label, Pockets Linted.

Track listing

"Intro"
"Get Free" (feat. Shake da Mayor)
"U Got the Time"
"The Sweet Science" (feat. Chali 2na)
"Put Your Hands Up"
"Interlude"
"My Life"
"Making U Move" (feat. Reks)
"We Get Live"
"San Fran to the Town" (feat. Casual)
"Let's Get Down Tonight"
"Interlude"
"Snakes in the Grass (The John Sexton Story)"
"Endless" (feat. Planet Asia)
"Real Hot"
"All I Wanna Be" (feat. Kisha Griffin)

Credits

Producers 
 Brisk One – tracks 1, 2, 11, 14
 Kleph Dollaz – tracks 3, 8
 Jake One – tracks 4, 5, 9
 Jake One & Sampson S – track 10
 Richness – track 6
 Champ – track 7
 Omen – track 13
 Da Beatminerz – track 15
 Ammbush – track 16

2003 albums
Albums produced by Jake One
Albums produced by Da Beatminerz
Rasco albums